S100 calcium-binding protein B (S100B) is a protein of the S-100 protein family.

S100 proteins are localized in the cytoplasm and nucleus of a wide range of cells, and involved in the regulation of a number of cellular processes such as cell cycle progression and differentiation. S100 genes include at least 13 members which are located as a cluster on chromosome 1q21; however, this gene is located at 21q22.3.

Function 
S100B is glial-specific and is expressed primarily by astrocytes, but not all astrocytes express S100B. It has been shown that S100B is only expressed by a subtype of mature astrocytes that ensheath blood vessels and by NG2-expressing cells.

This protein may function in neurite extension, proliferation of melanoma cells, stimulation of Ca2+ fluxes, inhibition of PKC-mediated phosphorylation, astrocytosis and axonal proliferation, and inhibition of microtubule assembly. In the developing CNS it acts as a neurotrophic factor and neuronal survival protein. In the adult organism it is usually elevated due to nervous system damage, which makes it a potential clinical marker.

Clinical significance 

Chromosomal rearrangements and altered expression of this gene have been implicated in several neurological, neoplastic, and other types of diseases, including Alzheimer disease, Down syndrome, epilepsy, amyotrophic lateral sclerosis, schwannoma, melanoma, and type I diabetes mellitus.

It has been suggested that the regulation of S100B by melittin has potential for the treatment of epilepsy.

Diagnostic use 

S100B is secreted by astrocytes or can spill from injured cells and enter the extracellular space or bloodstream. Serum levels of S100B increase in patients during the acute phase of brain damage.  Over the last decade, S100B has emerged as a candidate peripheral biomarker of blood–brain barrier  (BBB) permeability and CNS injury.  Elevated S100B levels accurately reflect the presence of neuropathological conditions including traumatic head injury or neurodegenerative diseases.  Normal S100B levels reliably exclude major CNS pathology.  Its potential clinical use in the therapeutic decision making process is substantiated by a vast body of literature (citation?) validating variations in serum 100B levels with standard modalities for prognosticating the extent of CNS damage: alterations in neuroimaging, cerebrospinal pressure, and other brain molecular markers (neuron specific enolase and glial fibrillary acidic protein).  However, more importantly, S100B levels have been reported to rise prior to any detectable changes in intracerebral pressure, neuroimaging, and neurological examination findings.  Thus, the major advantage of using S100B is that elevations in serum or CSF levels provide a sensitive measure for determining CNS injury at the molecular level before gross changes develop, enabling timely delivery of crucial medical intervention before irreversible damage occurs. S100B serum levels are elevated before seizures suggesting that BBB leakage may be an early event in seizure development.

An extremely important application of serum  S100B testing is in the selection of patients with minor head injury who do not need further neuroradiological evaluation, as studies comparing CT scans and S100B levels have demonstrated S100B values below 0.12 ng/mL are associated with low risk of obvious neuroradiological changes (such as intracranial hemorrhage or brain swelling) or significant clinical sequelae. The excellent negative predictive value of S100B in several neurological conditions is due to the fact that serum S100B levels reflect blood–brain barrier permeability changes even in absence of neuronal injury.
In addition, S100B, which is also present in human melanocytes, is a reliable marker for melanoma malignancy both in bioptic tissue and in serum.

Model organisms 

Model organisms have been used in the study of S100B function. A conditional knockout mouse line, called S100btm1a(EUCOMM)Wtsi was generated as part of the International Knockout Mouse Consortium program — a high-throughput mutagenesis project to generate and distribute animal models of disease to interested scientists — at the Wellcome Trust Sanger Institute.

Male and female animals underwent a standardized phenotypic screen to determine the effects of deletion. Twenty three tests were carried out on mutant mice, but no significant abnormalities have yet been observed.

Interactions 

S100B has been shown to interact with:
 AHNAK,
 IMPA1,
 IQGAP1,
 MAPT, and
 P53,
 PGM1,
 S100A1,
 S100A6,
 S100A11,
 VAV1.

References

Further reading 

 
 
 
 
 
 
 
 
 
 
 
 
 
 
 
 
 
 
 
 

Molecular neuroscience
S100 proteins
Genes mutated in mice